The 1979–80 VfL Bochum season was the 42nd season in club history.

Review and events
On 26 January 1980 21-year-old midfielder Lutz Gerresheim was involved in a car accident and fell into a coma. Gerresheim died on 10 March 1980.

Matches

Legend

Bundesliga

DFB-Pokal

Squad

Squad and statistics

Squad, appearances and goals scored

Transfers

Summer

In:

Out:

Winter

In:

Out:

Sources

External links
 1979–80 VfL Bochum season at Weltfussball.de 
 1979–80 VfL Bochum season at kicker.de 
 1979–80 VfL Bochum season at Fussballdaten.de 

Bochum
VfL Bochum seasons